The Grand Ethiopian Renaissance Dam (GERD or TaIHiGe; ,), formerly known as the Millennium Dam and sometimes referred to as the Hidase Dam, is a gravity dam on the Blue Nile River in Ethiopia under construction since 2011. 

The primary purpose of the dam is electricity production to relieve Ethiopia's acute energy shortage and for electricity export to neighbouring countries. With a planned installed capacity of 5.15 gigawatts, the dam will be the largest hydroelectric power plant in Africa when completed,
as well as among the 20 largest in the world.

First phase of filling the reservoir began in July 2020 and in August 2020 water level increased to 540 meters (40 meters higher than the bottom of the river which is at 500 meters above sea level).
The second phase of filling was completed on 19 July 2021, water level increased to around 575 meters.
Actual water level (November 2022) is at around 605 meters and was measured at Sentinel images. It will take between 4 and 7 years to fill with water,
depending on hydrologic conditions during the filling period.

On 20 February 2022, the dam produced electricity for the first time, delivering it to the grid at a rate of 375 MW.
A second 375 MW turbine was commissioned in August 2022.

Background 
The name that the Blue Nile river takes in Ethiopia ("Abay") is derived from the Ge'ez word for 'great' to imply its being 'the river of rivers'. The word Abay still exists in Ethiopian major languages to refer to anything or anyone considered to be superior.

The eventual site for the Grand Ethiopian Renaissance Dam was identified by the United States Bureau of Reclamation in the course of the Blue Nile survey, which was conducted between 1956 and 1964 during the reign of Emperor Haile Selassie. Due to the coup d'état of 1974 and following 17-year-long Ethiopian Civil War, however, the project failed to progress. The Ethiopian Government surveyed the site in October 2009 and August 2010. In November 2010, a design for the dam was submitted by James Kelston. 
  
On 31 March 2011, a day after the project was made public, a US$4.8 billion contract was awarded without competitive bidding to Italian company Salini Impregilo, and the dam's foundation stone was laid on 2 April 2011 by the Prime Minister Meles Zenawi. A rock-crushing plant was constructed, along with a small air strip for fast transportation. The expectation was for the first two power-generation turbines to become operational after 44 months of construction, or early 2015. 
  
Zenawi argued, based on an unnamed study, that the dam would not reduce water availability downstream and would also regulate water for irrigation. In May 2011, it was announced that Ethiopia would share blueprints for the dam with Egypt so that the downstream impact could be examined.

The dam was originally called "Project X", and after its contract was announced it was called the Millennium Dam. On 15 April 2011, the Council of Ministers renamed it Grand Ethiopian Renaissance Dam. Ethiopia has a potential for about 45 GW of hydropower. The dam is being funded by government bonds and private donations. It was slated for completion in July 2017.

The potential impacts of the dam have been the source of severe regional controversy. The Government of Egypt, a country which depends on the Nile for about 97% of its irrigation and drinking water,  has demanded that Ethiopia cease construction on the dam as a precondition to negotiations, has sought regional support for its position, and some political leaders have discussed methods to sabotage it. Egypt has planned a diplomatic initiative to undermine support for the dam in the region as well as in other countries supporting the project such as China and Italy. However, other nations in the Nile Basin Initiative have expressed support for the dam, including Sudan, the only other nation downstream of the Blue Nile, although Sudan's position towards the dam has varied over time. In 2014, Sudan accused Egypt of inflaming the situation.

Ethiopia denies that the dam will have a negative impact on downstream water flows and contends that the dam will, in fact, increase water flows to Egypt by reducing evaporation on Lake Nasser.  Ethiopia has accused Egypt of being unreasonable; In October 2019, Egypt stated that talks with Sudan and Ethiopia over the operation of a $4 billion hydropower dam that Ethiopia is building on the Nile have reached a deadlock. Beginning in November 2019, U.S. Secretary of the Treasury Steven T. Mnuchin began facilitating negotiations between the three countries.

Cost and financing 
The Grand Ethiopian Renaissance Dam (GERD) is estimated to cost close to 5 billion US dollars, about 7% of the 2016 Ethiopian gross national product. The lack of international financing for projects on the Blue Nile River has persistently been attributed to Egypt's campaign to keep control on the Nile water share. Ethiopia has been forced to finance the GERD with crowd funding through internal fund raising in the form of selling bonds and persuading employees to contribute a portion of their incomes. Contributions are made in the newly official website confirmed by the verified account of the Office of the Prime Minister of Ethiopia

Of the total cost, 1 billion US dollars for turbines and electrical equipment were funded by the Exim Bank of China.

Design 

The design changed several times between 2011 and 2019. This affected both the electrical parameters and the storage parameters.

Originally, in 2011, the hydropower plant was to receive 15 generating units with 350 MW nameplate capacity each, resulting in a total installed capacity of 5,250 MW with an expected power generation of 15,128 GWh per year. 
Its planned generation capacity was later increased to 6,000 MW, through 16 generating units with 375 MW nominal capacity each. The expected power generation was estimated at 15,692 GWh per year. In 2017, the design was again changed to add another 450 MW for a total of 6,450 MW, with a planned power generation of 16,153 GWh per year. 
That was achieved by upgrading 14 of the 16 generating units from 375 MW to 400 MW without changing the nominal capacity. According to a senior Ethiopian official, on 17 October 2019, the power generation capacity of the GERD is now 5,150 MW, with 13 turbines (2x 375 MW and 11x 400 MW) down from 16 turbines.

Not only the electrical power parameters changed over time, but also the storage parameters.

In 2013, an Independent Panel of Experts (IPoE) assessed the dam and its technological parameters. At that time, the reservoir sizes were changed already. These numbers did not change after 2013.

The outlet parameters did not change, only the crest of the main dam was raised.

The design parameters as of August 2017 are as follows, given the changes as outlined above:

Two dams 

The outlets of the two powerhouses are below the ground level, the total height of the dam will, therefore, be slightly higher than that of the given height of the dam. The structural volume of the dam will be . The main dam will be  from the border with Sudan.

The surface of the saddle dam has a bituminous finish, to keep the interior of the dam dry.

The live storage volume, usable for power generation between both levels is then .

Three spillways 
The dams will have three spillways. All using approximately 18,000 cubic meters of concrete. All waters from the three spillways are designed to discharge into the Blue Nile before the river enters Sudanese territory.

The dam crest is  higher to the left and to the right of the spillway. This ungated spillway is only expected to be used, if the reservoir is both full and the flow exceeds , a flow value, that is expected to be exceeded once every ten years.

This emergency spillway has an open space of about  along its rim.

Power generation and distribution 
Flanking either side of the auxiliary ungated spillway at the center of the dam will be two power houses, that will be equipped with 2 x 375 MW Francis turbine-generators and 11 x 400 MW turbines. The total installed capacity with all turbine-generators will be 5,150 MW. The average annual flow of the Blue Nile being available for power generation is expected to be , which gives rise to an annual expectation for power generation of 16,153 GWh, corresponding to a plant load factor (or capacity factor) of 28.6%.

A switching station will be located close to the main dam, where the generated power will be delivered to the national grid. Four 500 kV main power transmission lines were completed in August 2017, all going to Holeta and then with several 400 kV lines to the metropolitan area of Addis Ababa. Two 400 kV lines run from the dam to the Beles Hydroelectric Power Plant. Also planned are 500 kV high-voltage direct current lines.

Early power generation 
Two non-upgraded turbine-generators with 375 MW were first to go into operation with 750 MW delivered to the national power grid, while the first turbine  was commissioned in February 2022 and the second one in August 2022. The two units sit within the 10 unit powerhouse to the right side of the dam at the auxiliary spillway. During the rainy season, this is expected to happen within days to weeks. The first stage filling of the reservoir for early generation was completed on 20 July 2020.

Siltation, evaporation 

The space below the "bottom" outlets is the primary buffer space for alluvium through siltation and sedimentation. The GERD reservoir will foreseeably take away the siltation threat from the Roseires reservoir almost entirely.

There is only a  elevation difference between both projects. The two reservoirs and accompanying hydropower projects could – if coordinated properly across the border between Ethiopia and Sudan – become a cascaded system for more efficient hydropower generation and better irrigation (in Sudan in particular). Water from the  column of the water storage of the GERD reservoir could be diverted through tunnels to facilitate new irrigation schemes in Sudan close to the border with South Sudan. In Ethiopia itself, no irrigation schemes are planned due to the proximity of the dam to the downstream border with Sudan.

This was considered negligible by the IPoE. For comparison, Lake Nasser in Egypt loses between  annually through evaporation.

Construction 
The main contractor is the Italian company Webuild (formerly Salini Impregilo), which also served as primary contractor for the Gilgel Gibe II, Gilgel Gibe III and Tana Beles dams. Simegnew Bekele was the project manager of GERD from the start of construction in 2011 up to his death on 26 July 2018. In October same year he was replaced by Kifle Horo. The dam is expected to require 10 million cubic meters of concrete. The government has pledged to use only domestically produced concrete. In March 2012, Salini awarded the Italian firm Tratos Cavi SPA a contract to supply low- and high-voltage cable for the dam. Alstom will provide the eight 375 MW Francis turbines for the project's first phase, at a cost of €250 million. As of April 2013, nearly 32 per cent of the project was complete. Site excavation and some concrete placement was underway. One concrete batch plant has been completed with another under construction. Diversion of the Blue Nile was completed on 28 May 2013 and marked by a ceremony the same day.

In October 2019, the work was approximately 70% complete. , the steelworks reached 35% complete, civil works are 87% complete while electro-mechanical works are 17% complete, to attain in total 71% construction complete according to Belachew Kasa, Project Deputy Director.

On 26 June 2020, Egypt, Sudan and Ethiopia agreed to delay filling the reservoir for a few weeks.

On 21 July 2020, Ethiopian prime minister, Abiy Ahmed, announced that the first phase of filling the reservoir had been completed. The early filling was attributed to heavy rains. In his statement, Abiy stated that "We have successfully completed the first dam filling without bothering and hurting anyone else. Now the dam is overflowing downstream". The target for the first year filling was 4.9 cubic kilometres, while the dam has capacity to hold 74 cubic kilometres when completed.

The first phase of filling the reservoir began in July 2020, to a maximum depth of  utilising a temporary sill. Further construction work is necessary before the reservoir can be filled to a level for electricity generation.

In February 2021, Ethiopian Minister of Water and Irrigation, Seleshi Bekele, mentioned that the engineering work in constructing the dam reached 91%, while the total construction rate was 78.3%. In May 2021, Minister of Water and Irrigation Seleshi Bekele mentioned that 80% of dam construction was complete.

Controversies

Engineering questions 
In 2012, the International Panel of Experts was formed with experts from Egypt, Sudan, Ethiopia and other independent entities to discuss mainly engineering and partially impact related questions. This panel concluded at a number of engineering modifications, that were proposed to Ethiopia and the main contractor constructing the dam. One of the two main engineering questions, dealing with the size of flood events and the constructive response against them, was later addressed by the contractor. The emergency spillway located near the rock saddle dam saw an increase of the rim length from 300 m to 1,200 m to account even for the largest possible flood of the river.

The second main recommendation of the panel however found no immediate resolution. This second recommendation dealt with the structural integrity of the dam in context with the underlying rock basement as to avoid the danger of a sliding dam due to an unstable basement. It was argued by the panel, that the original structural investigations considered only a generic rock mass without taking special conditions like faults and sliding planes in the rock basement (gneiss) into account. The panel noted, that there was indeed an exposed sliding plane in the rock basement, this plane potentially allowing a sliding process downstream. The panel didn't argue that a catastrophic dam failure with a release of dozens of cubic kilometres of water would be possible, probable or even likely, but the panel argued, that the given safety factor to avoid such a catastrophic failure might be non-optimal in the case of the Grand Ethiopian Renaissance Dam. It was later revealed that the underlying basement of the dam was completely different from all expectations and did not fit the geological studies as the needed excavation works exposed the underlying gneiss. The engineering works then had to be adjusted, with digging and excavating deeper than originally planned , which took extra time and capacity and also required more concrete.

Alleged over-sizing 
Originally, in 2011, the hydropower plant was to receive 15 generating units with 350 MW nameplate capacity each, resulting in a total installed capacity of 5,250 MW with an expected power generation of 15,128 GWh per annum. The capacity factor of the planned hydropower plant – the expected electricity production divided by the potential production if the power plant was utilised permanently at full capacity – was only 32.9% compared to 45–60% for other, smaller hydropower plants in Ethiopia. Critics concluded that a smaller dam would have been more cost-effective.

Soon after, in 2012, the hydropower plant was upgraded to receive 16 generating units with 375 MW nameplate capacity each, increasing the total installed capacity to 6,000 MW, with the expected power generation going up only slightly to 15,692 GWh per annum. Consequently, the capacity factor shrank to 29.9%. According to Asfaw Beyene, a professor of mechanical engineering at San Diego State University in California, the dam and its hydropower plant are massively oversized: "GERD’s available power output, based on the average of river flow throughout the year and the dam height, is about 2,000 megawatts, not 6,000. There is little doubt that the system has been designed for a peak flow rate that only happens during the two to three months of the rainy season. Targeting near peak or peak flow rate makes no economic sense."

In 2017, the total installed capacity was moved to 6,450 MW, without changing the number and nameplate capacity of the generating units (which then remained at 6,000 MW in total). This was thought to arrive from enhancements made to the generators. The expected power generation per annum went up to 16,153 GWh, the capacity factor shrank again and reached 28.6%. This time nobody publicly voiced concern. Such optimisation of the Francis turbines used at the dam site is indeed possible and is usually done by the provider of the turbines taking into account site-specific conditions.

Considering the critics voiced about the alleged over-sizing of the possible power output, now of 6,450 MW. Ethiopia is relying heavily on hydropower, but the country is often affected by droughts (see e.g. 2011 East Africa drought). The water reservoirs used for power generation in Ethiopia have a limited size. For example, the Gilgel Gibe I reservoir, that feeds both the Gilgel Gibe I powerplant and the Gilgel Gibe II Power Station, has a capacity of 0.7 km3. In times of drought, there is no water left to generate electrical power. This heavily affected Ethiopia in the drought years 2015/16 and it was only the Gilgel Gibe III powerplant, that in 2016 just started to run in trial service on a 14 km3 well-filled reservoir, that saved the economy of Ethiopia. The GERD reservoir, once it has been filled, has a total water volume of 74 km3, 3 times the volume of Ethiopia's largest lake, Lake Tana. Filling it takes 5–15 years and even by using all generating units at maximum capacity will not drain it within a few months. The installed power of 6.450 MW in combination with the size of the reservoir will help to manage the side effects of the next severe drought, when other hydropower plants have to stop their operations.

Security around dam 
In recent years due to the threat of a possible airstrike on the dam, the Ethiopian government has sought and bought several air defence systems some from Russia, including the Pantsir-S1 air defence system, and also Israeli air defences, including the SPYDER-MR medium-range air defence system which was installed in the dam. Egypt has sought to block a sale between Israel and Ethiopia but has failed due to the installations of the air defences on the dam. Israel was seen denying the request of Egypt by not answering their request.

Benefits  
A major benefit of the dam will be hydropower production. All the energy generated by GERD will be going into the national grid of Ethiopia to fully support the development of the whole country, both in rural and urban areas. The role of GERD will be to act as a stabilising backbone of the Ethiopian national grid. There will be exports, but only if there is a total surplus of energy generated in Ethiopia. This is mainly expected to happen during rainy seasons, when there is plenty of water for hydropower generation.

The eventual surplus electricity of GERD which does not fit the demand inside Ethiopia, is then to be sold and exported to neighbouring countries including Sudan and possibly Egypt, but also Djibouti. Exporting the electricity from the dam would require the construction of massive transmission lines to major consumption centers such as Sudan's capital Khartoum, located more than 400 km away from the dam. These export sales would come on top of electricity that is expected to be sold from other large hydropower plants. Powerplants that have been readied or are under construction in Ethiopia, such as Gilgel Gibe III or Koysha, whose exports (if given surplus energy) will mainly be going to Kenya through a 500 kV HVDC line.

The volume of the reservoir will be two to three times that of Lake Tana.  Up to 7,000 tonnes of fish are expected to be harvested annually. The reservoir may become a  tourist destination.

Sudan expects a reduce in floods thanks to the dam, but this has not been observed in reality yet.

Environmental and social impacts 

The NGO International Rivers has commissioned a local researcher to make a field visit because so little environmental impact information is publicly available.

Public consultation about dams in Ethiopia is affected by the political climate in the country. International Rivers reports that "conversations with civil society groups in Ethiopia indicate that questioning the government's energy sector plans is highly risky, and there are legitimate concerns of government persecution. Because of this political climate, no groups are actively pursuing the issues surrounding hydro-power dams, nor publicly raising concerns about the risks in this situation, extremely limited and inadequate public consultation has been organised" during the implementation of major dams. In June 2011, Ethiopian journalist Reeyot Alemu was imprisoned after she raised questions about the proposed Grand Millennium Dam. Staff of International Rivers have received death threats. Former prime minister Meles Zenawi called opponents of the project  "hydropower extremists" and "bordering on the criminal" at a conference of the International Hydropower Association (IHA) in Addis Ababa in April 2011. At the conference, the Ethiopian state power utility was embraced as a "Sustainability Partner" by the IHA.

Impact on Ethiopia 
Since the Blue Nile is a highly seasonal river, the dam would reduce flooding downstream of the dam, including on the 15 km stretch within Ethiopia. On the one hand, the reduction of flooding is beneficial since it protects settlements from flood damage. On the other hand, it can be harmful if flood recession agriculture is practised in the river valley downstream of the dam since it deprives fields from being watered. However, the next water regulating dam in Sudan, the Roseires Dam, sits only a few dozens of kilometres downstream. The dam could also serve as a bridge across the Blue Nile, complementing a bridge that was under construction in 2009 further upstream. An independent assessment estimated that at least 5,110 people will be resettled from the reservoir and downstream area, and the dam is expected to lead to a significant change in the fish ecology. According to an independent researcher who conducted research in the area,  20,000 people are being relocated. According to the same source, "a solid plan (is) in place for the relocated people" and those who have already been resettled "were given more than they expected in compensation". Locals have never seen a dam before  and "are not completely sure what a dam actually is", despite community meetings in which affected people were informed about the impacts of the dam on their livelihoods. Except for a few older people, almost all locals interviewed "expressed hope that the project brings something of benefit to them" in terms of education and health services or electricity supply based on the information available to them. At least some of the new communities for those relocated will be downstream of the dam. The area around the reservoir will consist of a 5 km buffer zone for malaria control that will not be available for settlement. In at least some upstream areas erosion control measures will be undertaken in order to reduce siltation of the reservoir.

Impact on Sudan and Egypt 

The precise impact of the dam on the downstream countries is not known. Egypt fears a temporary reduction of water availability due to the filling of the reservoir and a permanent reduction because of evaporation from the reservoir. Studies indicate that the primary factors which will govern the impacts during the reservoir filling phase include the initial reservoir elevation of the Aswan High Dam, the rainfall that occurs during the filling period and the negotiated arrangement between the three countries. These studies also show that only through close and continuous coordination, the risks of negative impacts can be minimised or eliminated. The reservoir volume (74 cubic kilometres) is about 1.5 times the average annual flow (49 cubic kilometres) of the Blue Nile at the Egypt–Sudan border. This loss to downstream countries could be spread over several years if the countries reach an agreement. Depending on the initial storage in the Aswan High Dam and this filling schedule of the GERD, flows into Egypt could be temporarily reduced, which may affect the livelihood of two million farmers during the period of filling the reservoir. Allegedly, it would also "affect Egypt's electricity supply by 25 to 40 percent, while the dam is being built". However, hydropower accounts for less than 12 per cent of total electricity production in Egypt in 2010 (14 out of 121 billion kWh), so that a temporary reduction of 25 per cent in hydropower production translates into an overall temporary reduction in Egyptian electricity production of less than 3 per cent. The Grand Ethiopian Renaissance Dam could also lead to a permanent lowering of the water level in Lake Nasser if floods are stored instead in Ethiopia. This would reduce the current evaporation of more than 10 cubic kilometres per year, but it would also reduce the ability of the Aswan High Dam to produce hydropower to the tune of a 100 MW loss of generating capacity for a 3 m reduction of the water level. However, the increased storage in Ethiopia can provide a greater buffer to shortages in Sudan and Egypt during years of future drought, if the countries can reach a compromise.

The dam will retain silt. It will thus increase the useful lifetime of dams in Sudan – such as the Roseires Dam, the Sennar Dam and the Merowe Dam – and of the Aswan High Dam in Egypt. The beneficial and harmful effects of flood control would affect the Sudanese portion of the Blue Nile, just as it would affect the Ethiopian part of the Blue Nile valley downstream of the dam. Specifically, the GERD would reduce seasonal flooding of the plains surrounding the reservoir of the Roseires Dam located at Ad-Damazin, just as the Tekeze Dam, by retaining a reservoir in the deep gorges of the northern Ethiopian Highlands, had reduced flooding at Sudan's Khashm el-Girba Dam.

The reservoir, located in the temperate Ethiopian Highlands and up to 140 m deep, will experience considerably less evaporation than downstream reservoirs such as Lake Nasser in Egypt, which loses 12% of its water flow due to evaporation as the water sits in the lake for 10 months. Through the controlled release of water from the reservoir to downstream, this could facilitate an increase of up to 5% in Egypt's water supply, and presumably that of Sudan as well.

Reactions: cooperation and condemnation 

Egypt has serious concerns about the project; therefore it requested to be granted inspection allowance on the design and the studies of the dam, in order to allay its fears, but Ethiopia has denied the request unless Egypt relinquishes its veto on water allocation. After a meeting between the Ministers of Water of Egypt, Sudan and Ethiopia in March 2012, Sudan's President Bashir said that he supported the building of the dam.

A Nile treaty signed by the upper riparian states in 2010, the Cooperative Framework Agreement, has not been signed by either Egypt or Sudan, as they claim it violates the 1959 treaty, in which Sudan and Egypt give themselves exclusive rights to all of the Nile's waters. The Nile Basin Initiative provides a framework for dialogue among all Nile riparian countries.

Egypt, Ethiopia and Sudan established an International Panel of Experts to review and assess the study reports of the dam. The panel consists of 10 members; 6 from the three countries and 4 international in the fields of water resources and hydrologic modelling, dam engineering, socioeconomic and environmental. The panel held its fourth meeting in Addis Ababa in November 2012. It reviewed documents about the environmental impact of the dam and visited the dam site. The panel submitted its preliminary report to the respective governments at the end of May 2013. Although the full report has not been made public, and will not be until it is reviewed by the governments, Egypt and Ethiopia both released details. The Ethiopian government stated that, according to the report, "the design of the dam is based on international standards and principles" without naming those standards and principles. It also said that the dam "offers high benefit for all the three countries and would not cause significant harm on both the lower riparian countries". According to Egyptian government, however, the report "recommended changing and amending the dimensions and the size of the dam". As of mid-July 2022 the three-way negotiations were not held for more than a year.

On 3 June 2013, while discussing the International Panel of Experts report with President Mohammad Morsi, Egyptian political leaders suggested methods to destroy the dam, including support for anti-government rebels. Unbeknownst to those at the meeting, the discussion was televised live. Ethiopia requested that the Egyptian Ambassador explain the meeting. Morsi's top aide apologised for the "unintended embarrassment" and his cabinet released a statement promoting "good neighbourliness, mutual respect and the pursuit of joint interests without either party harming the other." An aide to the Ethiopian Prime Minister stated that Egypt is "...entitled to daydreaming" and cited Egypt's past of trying to destabilise Ethiopia. Morsi reportedly believes that it is better to engage Ethiopia rather than attempt to force them. However, on 10 June 2013, he said that "all options are open" because "Egypt's water security cannot be violated at all," clarifying that he was "not calling for war," but that he would not allow Egypt's water supply to be endangered.

In January 2014, Egypt left negotiations over the dam, citing Ethiopian intransigence. Ethiopia countered that Egypt had set an immediate halt on construction and an increase of its share to 90% as the preconditions, which were deemed wholly unreasonable. Egypt has since launched a diplomatic offensive to undermine support for the dam, sending its Foreign Minister, Nabil Fahmi to Tanzania and the Democratic Republic of the Congo to garner support. Egyptian media outlets declared the visits productive and that the leaders of those nations had expressed "understanding" and "support" of Egypt's position. Sudanese Foreign Minister Ali Karti criticised Egypt for "inflaming the situation" through its statements on the dam, and that it was considering the interests of both sides. Al-Masry Al-Youm declared that Sudan had "proclaimed its neutrality". The campaign is intensive and wide-reaching; in March 2014, for the first time, only Uganda, Kenya, Sudan and Tanzania were invited by Egypt to participate in the Nile Hockey Tournament. Foreign Minister Fahmi and Water Resources Minister Muhammad Abdul Muttalib planned visits to Italy and Norway to express their concerns and try to compel them to pull their support for the GERD.

In April 2014, Ethiopia's Prime Minister invited Egypt and Sudan to another round of talks over the dam and Nabil Fahmi stated in May 2014 that Egypt was still open to negotiations. Following an August 2014 Tripartite Ministerial-level meeting, the three nations agreed to set up a Tripartite National Committee (TNC) meeting over the dam. The first TNC meeting occurred from 20 to 22 September 2014 in Ethiopia.

In October 2019, Ethiopian Prime Minister Abiy Ahmed warned that "no force can stop Ethiopia from building a dam. If there is need to go to war, we could get millions readied."

Beginning in November 2019, U.S. Treasury Secretary Steven Mnuchin facilitated negotiations between the governments of Egypt, Ethiopia and Sudan with respect to the filling and the operation of the dam. Ethiopia proposed filling the reservoir with a release of 35 cubic kilometres of water per year, resulting in the complete filling of the reservoir in five years. Egypt countered that this would be too little, and demanded a larger amount of water to be released each year, asking for 40 cubic kilometres of water to be released and for the reservoir to be filled within seven years. In February 2020, Mnuchin said in a statement: "We appreciate the readiness of the government of Egypt to sign the agreement and its initialing of the agreement to evidence its commitment," adding "consistent with the principles set out in the DOP, and in particular the principles of not causing significant harm to downstream countries, final testing and filling should not take place without an agreement." Ethiopian Foreign Minister Gedu Andargachew said Mnuchin's advice to Ethiopia was "ill-advised".

In February 2020, the U.S. Treasury Department stated that "final testing and filling should not take place without an agreement." after Ethiopia skipped US talks with Egypt over the dam dispute. Ethiopians online expressed anger using the hashtag #itismydam over what they claim was the US and the World Bank's siding with Egypt contrary to the co-observer role initially promised. The online campaign coincided with Ethiopia's annual public holiday celebrating the 1896 Ethiopian victory at the Battle of Adwa, a decisive victory that successfully thwarted the 1896 Italian colonial campaign. Ethiopia has stated that "it will not be pressured on Nile River".

In July 2020, Ethiopian Foreign Minister Gedu Andargachew tweeted: "the river became a lake... the Nile is ours." In the same month, talks between water ministers from three involved countries resumed under African Union supervision.

In September 2020, the United States suspended part of its economic assistance to Ethiopia due to the lack of sufficient progress in negotiations with Sudan and Egypt over the construction of the dam. On 24 October 2020, U.S. President Donald Trump stated on a public phone call to Sudan's Prime Minister Abdalla Hamdok and Israel's Prime Minister Benjamin Netanyahu that "it's a very dangerous situation because Egypt is not going to be able to live that way... And I said it and I say it loud and clear - they'll blow up that dam. And they have to do something." Ethiopian Prime Minister Abiy Ahmed responded that "Ethiopia will not cave in to aggression of any kind" and that threats were "misguided, unproductive and clear violations of international law."

In April 2021, Egyptian President Abdel Fattah el-Sisi warned: "I am telling our brothers in Ethiopia, let’s not reach the point where you touch a drop of Egypt’s water, because all options are open." The dispute between Sudan and Ethiopia over the dam escalated in 2021. An advisor to the Sudanese leader Abdel Fattah al-Burhan spoke of a water war "that would be more horrible than one could imagine".

On 8 July 2021, the U.N. Security Council held a session to discuss the dispute over the dam filling.

During Joe Biden's July 2022 meeting in the Middle East, he met with Abdel Fattah el-Sisi and restated American support for Egypt's "water security" and "forging a diplomatic resolution that would achieve the interests of all parties and contribute to a more peaceful and prosperous region."

During the summer of 2022, U.S. envoy Mike Hammer visited both Egypt and later Ethiopia to build relations and discuss the Ethiopian dam.

In August 2022, the United Arab Emirates (which has good relations with both Ethiopia and Egypt) has stated that it wants the three nations to hold meetings once again.

See also 

 Water politics
 Renewable energy in Ethiopia
 Dams and reservoirs in Ethiopia
 List of power stations in Ethiopia
 Water politics in the Nile Basin
 Foreign relations of Ethiopia
 Jonglei Canal
 Genale Dawa III Hydroelectric Power Station

References 

Dams in Ethiopia
Dams under construction
Reservoirs in Ethiopia
Gravity dams
Blue Nile
Dams in the Nile basin
Hydroelectric power stations in Ethiopia
Roller-compacted concrete dams
Dam controversies
Water conflicts
Egypt–Ethiopia relations